James Alexander Paget Kirkpatrick (born March 29, 1991) is a Canadian field hockey player who plays as a midfielder or forward for West Vancouver and the Canadian national team.

He also played club hockey in France for Racing Club de France.

International career
Kirkpatrick represented Canada at the 2018 World Cup, where he played all four games. In June 2019, he was selected in the Canada squad for the 2019 Pan American Games. They won the silver medal as they lost 5–2 to Argentina in the final.

In June 2021, Kirkpatrick was named to Canada's 2020 Summer Olympics team.

References

External links
 
 James Kirkpatrick at Field Hockey Canada
 
 
 

1991 births
Living people
Field hockey players from Victoria, British Columbia
Canadian male field hockey players
Male field hockey midfielders
Male field hockey forwards
Field hockey players at the 2018 Commonwealth Games
2018 Men's Hockey World Cup players
Field hockey players at the 2019 Pan American Games
Pan American Games silver medalists for Canada
Pan American Games medalists in field hockey
West Vancouver Field Hockey Club players
Expatriate field hockey players
Canadian expatriate sportspeople in France
Medalists at the 2019 Pan American Games
Commonwealth Games competitors for Canada
Field hockey players at the 2020 Summer Olympics
Olympic field hockey players of Canada